Bitch Slap is a 2009 American film directed by Rick Jacobson. 

Bitch Slap may also refer to:

Bitch slap, a slang term for a type of physical abuse
"Bitch Slap", a song by Reks from the album The Greatest X
Bitchslap (professional wrestling), a female wrestling team